João Duarte (born 1952 in Lisbon) is the recipient of the American Numismatic Society's 2011 J. Sanford Saltus Award for Signal Achievement in the Art of the Medal.

References

External links
 https://escultorjoaoduarte.com/ 

Portuguese numismatists
1952 births
Date of birth missing (living people)
Living people
People from Lisbon
21st-century Portuguese people